Cookie is a 1989 American comedy film directed by Susan Seidelman starring Peter Falk, Emily Lloyd and Dianne Wiest.

Plot
Cookie Voltecki jumps the turnstiles at a public transit station with her friend and is caught by transit security who fine her and bring her to court. There she is defended from her charges by a lawyer she does not know. She is subsequently taken to her estranged father, Dino Capisco, who is about to finish a thirteen-year prison sentence. To straighten Cookie out he sends her to work with Carmine, an old associate of his.

Dino is successfully paroled and goes home with his wife Bunny, but shortly after goes to visit Cookie's mother Lenore Voltecki, Dino's longtime mistress. Cookie is disgusted with the way the married Dino treats her mother and Dino grows frustrated with Cookie, but at Lenore's urging, the two go to a Christmas party at Carmine's. At the party, Cookie and Dino fight and leave early. Aware that he is being followed by federal agents who want to put him back in prison, Dino has Cookie abandon their security detail. When photos of them are in newspapers, Dino tells his wife that Cookie is his driver and begins using her as such.

Dino reveals to Cookie he is actually angry with Carmine, who sold out his shares in a business they had together when Dino was in prison and now refuses to give him the money from the sale. Seeking revenge, Dino calls the union on Carmine's sweatshop and also has some of his men ransack trucks containing Carmine's merchandise. Retaliating, some of Carmine's men shoot at Dino's car while Cookie is driving it and later plant a bomb in Dino's car. However, no one is harmed.

A worried Cookie contacts the FBI. She offers to testify against her father's associates as long as he is put in witness protection. Dino vetoes the idea since he thinks Carmine's men will never stop hunting him down, but Cookie suggests they fake his death so that Carmine will not bother looking for him.
Dino and Cookie leak information that Dino has millions of dollars and is planning to retire to Italy. Carmine decides to steal the money and then kill Dino, but the plan goes awry when the money is stolen. Carmine goes to confront Dino and is blown up in his car. The district attorney is horrified that he accidentally killed Carmine, but Cookie tells him he still needs to honor his agreement to put Dino in witness protection, lest she divulge that he murdered someone.

Dino and Lenore leave to go to witness protection. Cookie hugs her father and takes a picture of the three of them as a family.

Cookie attends Dino's funeral while elsewhere Dino and Lenore marry and make plans to spend their lives together with their new identities.

Cast

Reception
The film received negative reviews from critics upon its release and has a 13% rating on Rotten Tomatoes from 15 reviews, with an average rating of 4.5/10.

The film was said by Roger Ebert to be funny and pleasant in some sense, but he felt it "[wasn't] very memorable probably because the filmmakers didn't have a clear vision of it themselves."

Music
"Slammer" by Thomas Newman is the opening theme. "I Should Be So Lucky", performed by Australian actress/singer Kylie Minogue, is played over the end credits.

Home media
Warner Archives released the film on made-to-order DVD in the United States on May 4, 2010.

References

External links
 
 
 

1989 films
American crime comedy films
1980s English-language films
Films directed by Susan Seidelman
Mafia comedy films
Warner Bros. films
Films shot in New Jersey
Films shot in Atlantic City, New Jersey
Films set in New Jersey
Films with screenplays by Nora Ephron
Films scored by Thomas Newman
1980s crime comedy films
Films produced by Laurence Mark
1989 comedy films
Films about witness protection
1980s American films